Acidisoma is a genus in the phylum Pseudomonadota (Bacteria). It contains two species, Acidisoma tundrae and Acidisoma sibiricum, both  two acidophilic (pH 3.0–7.6) and psychrotolerant (2–30 °C) bacteria with poly-β-hydroxybutyrate granules, isolated from acidic Sphagnum-dominated tundra and Siberian wetlands in Russia.

Etymology
The name Acidisoma derives from:New Latin noun acidum (from Latin adjective acidus -a -um, sour, tart, acid), an acid; Greek neuter gender noun soma (σῶμα), body; New Latin neuter gender noun Acidisoma, an acid (-requiring) body.

See also
 Bacterial taxonomy
 Microbiology

References 

Bacteria genera
Rhodospirillales